Carlos de Almeida Afonseca Sampaio Garrido  (5 April 1883 – April 1960) was a Portuguese diplomat credited with saving the lives of approximately 1,000 Jews in Nazi-occupied Hungary while serving as Portugal's ambassador in Budapest between July and December 1944.

Life and work

He served as Minister Plenipotentiary and acting Ambassador of Portugal in Budapest from 1939-44. Along with Teixeira Branquinho, (Portuguese Chargé d'Affaires in Budapest in 1944) Garrido rented houses and apartments to shelter and protect refugees from deportation and murder. They obtained permission from the Portuguese government to issue safe conduct passes to all persons who had relatives in Portugal, Brazil, or the Portuguese colonies or had a connection to Portugal. Garrido and Branquinho also established an office of the Portuguese Red Cross at the Portuguese legation to care for Jewish refugees. This was largely done in cooperation with the Portuguese Foreign Office and under Prime Minister António de Oliveira Salazar’s direct supervision with the provision that these refugees would not try to get Portuguese citizenship.

On 23 April 1944 and following the German occupation of Hungary, the Portuguese ruler Salazar decided to order his ambassador to return to Lisbon and leave the chargé d'affaires, Teixeira Branquinho in his place. This recall was done in response to a request from Britain and the United States who wanted neutral countries to downgrade their diplomatic presence in Hungary. 

Five days later, on 28 April 1944, at 5 a.m., the Hungarian political police raided the Ambassador's home arresting his guests. The Ambassador physically resisted the police and was also arrested but managed to have his guests released by invoking the extraterritorial legal rights of diplomatic legations. Five of the guests were members from the famous Gabor family. Magda Gabor, Hungarian-born actress and socialite, and the elder sister of Zsa Zsa and Eva Gabor, was reported to have been the secretary, fiancée and lover of Sampaio Garrido. 

Jolie Gabor, mother of the Gabor sisters, never forgot Magda's influential connections with rescuing her: "For Magda's Portuguese Ambassador I thank God. It was this man who saved my life." Gabor's maternal grandmother and uncle Sebastian (Annette Lantos's father) chose to remain in Budapest feeling they "had a good place to hide". However, both were killed during an Allied bombing raid.

In 1945 he was appointed extraordinary envoy and minister plenipotentiary to Stockholm, Sweden. In 2006 the International Raoul Wallenberg Foundation honored both Sampayo Garrido and his chargé d'affaires Carlos de Liz-Texeira Branquinho.

In 2010 he became the second Portuguese to be recognised as a Righteous Among the Nations by Yad Vashem; Aristides de Sousa Mendes having been recognised in 1966.

Distinctions

National orders
 Grand Officer of the Order of Christ (5 October 1934)
 Commander of the Order of Christ (23 October 1932)
 Officer of the Order of Saint James of the Sword (27 October 1934)
 Grand Officer of the Order of Liberty (4 January 1996)

See also

 List of individuals and groups assisting Jews during the Holocaust
 List of Righteous among the Nations by country
 InterContinental Budapest

References

Notes

Sources
Milgram, Avraham. Portugal, Salazar, and the Jews, translated by Naftali Greenwood. Jerusalem, Yad Vashem, 2011.
Pimentel, Irene Flunser, Judeus em Portugal Durante a II Guerra Mundial, Lisbon: A Esfera do Livros, 2006;

External links
 Carlos Sampaio Garrido at Yad Vashem website

Catholic Righteous Among the Nations
1883 births
1960 deaths
Ambassadors of Portugal to Hungary
Place of birth missing
Portuguese Righteous Among the Nations
Portuguese Roman Catholics
Grand Officers of the Order of Christ (Portugal)
Commanders of the Order of Christ (Portugal)
Officers of the Order of Saint James of the Sword
Grand Officers of the Order of Liberty